Tragocephala castnia is a species of beetle in the family Cerambycidae. It was described by James Thomson in 1857. It has a wide distribution in Africa. It feeds on Theobroma cacao.

Subspecies
 Tragocephala castnia castnia Thomson, 1857
 Tragocephala castnia castniopsis Entwistle, 1963
 Tragocephala castnia cacaoensis Entwistle, 1963
 Tragocephala castnia islandica Entwistle, 1963
 Tragocephala castnia theobromae Entwistle, 1963
 Tragocephala castnia gorillaformis Entwistle, 1963
 Tragocephala castnia leonensis Thomson, 1878

References

castnia
Beetles described in 1857